Karacahisar Castle, Karaca Hisar Castle or Karajahisar Castle is a ruined Byzantine castle on a plateau near the Porsuk River, southwest of Eskişehir, Turkey.

Before being captured by Osman I in 1288, which the castle is known for, Seljuk Sultan Kayqubad I besieged Karacahisar Castle in 1231. However, when he received news that the Mongols had entered Anatolia, he gave the siege to Ertugrul (father of Osman I). In the siege (1231-1232), Ertugrul and his veteran warriors conquered the castle after a long struggle.

Osman I's conquest

After establishing his beylik, Osman Gazi focused on expanding at the expense of the Byzantine Empire, and since that time, the primary Ottoman goal became the conquest of the remaining Byzantine lands. Indicated by some accounts, attempting to avenge a defeat, Osman I fought a battle against the Tekfur of Inegol, in which he was defeated and forced to withdraw with casualties including his nephew  Koca Saruhan bey. Based on this, in the next year, Osman went forward to Kulacahisar at night and managed to conquer it.

The battle
The Ottoman victory at Kulacahisar triggered the fort's governor, who refused to be a subordinate subject to a Muslim ruler, especially a border emir, to ally himself with Karacahisar's governor. Both men agreed to fight the Muslims aiming at retaking all Byzantine lands that were lost recently. Thus, the Ottomans and the Byzantines met again in battle, on ikizce hills , where fierce fighting took place in which Osman's brother Savcı Bey and the Byzantine commander kalanoz were killed. The Battle ended with an Ottoman victory. Then, the Ottomans entered Karacahisar where  Osman appointed dursun fakih (student of shiekh edebali)  Qadi (magistrate) and Subaşı (chief of police) for the newly conquered city. Historians differ in determining the date of this conquest, yet none made it prior to 685 AH / 1286 CE, or exceeding 691 AH / 1291 CE. Osman made his new city a staging base of his military campaigns against the Byzantines, and ordered that his name be delivered at the Friday sermon (khuṭbah), which was the first manifestation of his sovereignty and authority.

Response by the Seljuks
Osman's latest victory was his greatest up to that date. Seljuk Sultan Alâeddin Kayqubad III expressed his deep appreciation for Osman's accomplishments in the name of the Seljuks and Islam, giving him the title of Ḥaḍrat ʻUthmān ghāzī marzubān 'âli jâh ʻUthmān Shāh (the honourable conqueror and border guardian Osman Shah). The Seljuk Sultan also bestowed upon Osman the governance of all the land he had conquered as well as the towns of Eskişehir and İnönü. Moreover, the Sultan issued a decree exempting Osman from all types of taxes. Osman also received several gifts from the Sultan reflecting the new high stature to the Seljuk court. These gifts included: a golden war banner, a Mehter (war drum), a Tuğ (a pole with circularly arranged horse tail hairs), a tassel, a gilded sword, a loose saddle, and one hundred thousand Dirhams. The decree also included the recognition of Osman's right to be mentioned in the Friday khuṭbah in all lands subject to him, and was permitted to mint coins in his name. Thus, Osman became a sultan, only lacking the title.

It is narrated that when drums were beaten announcing Sultan Kayqubad's arrival, Osman stood up in glorification, and remained so till the march music halted. Since that day, Ottoman soldiers enacted standing in glorification for their Sultan whenever drums were beaten.

See also
 Dorylaeum

References 

Byzantine Empire
Buildings and structures in Eskişehir Province